Anantapur is a village in Belgaum district in the southern state of Karnataka, India.

Sources
"Belgaum District Stats". City Municipal Commissioner of Belgaum, Govt. of Karnataka. 10 July 2012. Archived from the original on 12 May 2013. Retrieved 25 May 2013.
"Census of India 2011: Data from the 2011 Census, including cities, villages 
Cousens, Henry (1996) [1926]. The Chalukyan Architecture of Kanarese District. New Delhi: Archaeological Survey of India. OCLC 37526233.
Hermann Kulke and Dietmar Rothermund, A History of India, fourth edition, Routledge, 2004, 

Villages in Belagavi district